Ernest Charles Shearman (1859 – 17 April 1939) was a British architect.

He was the son of a physician, Charles James Shearman. In 1878 he was articled to Charles Barry, remaining his assistant until 1888, the year Shearman set off for Argentina, where he was architect to the Buenos Aires Great Southern Railway until 1891. On his return to the United Kingdom in 1892 he was elected an Associate of the Royal Institute of British Architects, and ten years later he began to practice independently. He was especially prolific in London, where he designed six churches between 1910 and 1935: St Matthew's Church, Wimbledon; St Silas Church, Kentish Town; St Barnabas Church, North Ealing; St Gabriel's Church, North Acton; St Barnabas Church, Temple Fortune and St Francis of Assisi Church, Isleworth. He also designed the west end of St Mark's Church, Leicester. He died in Winchester in 1939.

Bibliography
John Salmon, Ernest Charles Shearman (1859–1939). An Anglo-Catholic Architect. An Illustrated Introduction to his Work (Anglo-Catholic History Society, 2009)
Directory of British Architects 1834–1914, British Architectural Library

External links
http://www.saintsilas.org.uk/section/99
http://www.passmoreedwards.org.uk/pages/Architects/Shearman.htm

19th-century British architects
20th-century British architects
1869 births
1939 deaths
Associates of the Royal Institute of British Architects